Baby, New South Wales is a bounded rural locality and a civil parish of Gowen County, in New South Wales.

Baby is in Warrumbungle Shire at 31°17′54″S 149°30′04″E on the Ulimambra Creek, a tributary of the Castlereagh River.
The nearest town is the railway town of Ulimamambra.

The Baby State Forest and Baby Creek are named for the parish.

References

Localities in New South Wales
Geography of New South Wales
Central West (New South Wales)